Horsecore: An Unrelated Story That's Time Consuming is the debut album by the Houston, Texas based death/thrash metal band Dead Horse. It was released in 1989 on the independent label Death Ride Records, and again ten years later on Relapse Records, with accompanying bonus tracks consisting of the material from their 1988 demo Death Rides a Dead Horse.

Reception

Steve Huey of AllMusic called Horsecore a "trashy amalgamation of thrash, death metal and grindcore."

Track listing

Personnel
 Michael Haaga – vocals, guitars
 Greg Martin – guitars, backing vocals
 Allen (Alpo) Price – bass, backing vocals
 Ronnie Guyote – drums, backing vocals

References

1989 debut albums
Dead Horse (band) albums